Maria Savvishna Perekusikhina (1739–1824), was a Russian memoirist, a lady's maid of Empress Catherine the Great of Russia. She was a close friend and confidant of Catherine and quite influential.

Life
She was from a noble family. Her brother Basil Perekusikhin received a good education and died a senator (1724–1788).

Catherine's lady's maid from the 1760s onward, she was so trusted by Catherine that it was said that the favorites of Catherine the Great were all somewhat dependent upon her, as she was frequently assigned to act as a go-between. Her closeness to the monarch made her an unofficial channel for people who wanted something from Catherine. During her journey to the Crimea in 1787, Catherine reprimanded Grigory Potemkin for not seeing to the comfort of Perekusikhina. She was present at Catherine's death, and later wrote down her memories of her.

References
 В. О. Михневич. Исторические очерки и рассказы. В двух томах. Издание А. С. Суворина, 1900. Т.2. Очерк «М. С. Перекусихина».

1739 births
1824 deaths
Courtiers from the Russian Empire
Nobility from the Russian Empire
18th-century people from the Russian Empire
Memoirists from the Russian Empire
Maids
Court of Catherine the Great
Burials at Lazarevskoe Cemetery (Saint Petersburg)
Domestic workers in the Russian Empire
Women memoirists